Eurosport 2 Xtra was a premium sports channel in Portugal aimed at broadcasting events whose rights are exclusive to the Portuguese market, such as Formula One. The channel ceased to broadcast on February 28, 2017, after it failed to attract enough subscribers to break even.

Rights

Football
2017 Africa Cup of Nations

Motorsports
 Formula One
 24 Hours of Le Mans
 Formula E
 GP2 Series
 GP3 Series
 WTCC
 FIM Eni Superbike World Championship
 Dakar Rally

References

External links
 

Eurosport
Defunct television channels in Portugal
Television channels and stations established in 2016
Television channels and stations disestablished in 2017
2016 establishments in Portugal
2017 disestablishments in Portugal